Sarah Kate Ellis (born November 27, 1971) is an American media executive, journalist, and author.

After Ellis's graduation from Russell Sage College in 1993 with a degree in Sociology and minor in Women's Studies, she began her career in media through the re-launch of Condé Nast's House & Garden.

In January 2014, Ellis was appointed president and CEO of GLAAD, the largest U.S. lesbian, gay, bisexual, and transgender (LGBT) media advocacy organization.

Early years 
Ellis was born and raised on Staten Island, where she attended Staten Island Academy. She and her older brother Spencer were raised by their parents, Barbara and Ken Ellis. During her youth, Ellis was an athlete; she participated in field hockey and was a Junior Olympic swimmer. While attending Russell Sage College, Ellis led a media campaign against the college administration's attempt to shut down the only women's center on campus and, in her senior year of college, Ellis came out of the closet as a lesbian. In 2011, Ellis was selected to attend the Tuck Executive Education program at Tuck School of Business Dartmouth College and completed it in 2012.

Media work

In 1995, Ellis began her profession in media. She first worked at mass media company Condé Nast, which laid the groundwork for her career advancement. Initially, Ellis worked at Condé Nast's House and Garden. From there, she moved to New York magazine as a senior manager, then to In Style as a director. Following her tenure at In Style, Ellis launched and directed the turnaround of Real Simple, which led her to Vogue where she oversaw 10 lifestyle group brands. Ellis specialized in marketing and applied her abilities most effectively through leadership roles. Extending the reach of her efforts, Ellis involved herself as co-chair of OUT at Time Inc., the company's LGBT employee resource group, where she led programming to spotlight the diversity of the LGBT community (2008-2013).

LGBT rights activism
Ellis began her activism for the LGBT community in 1992, when she marched on Washington to support the rights of women and then marched again in 1993 to support the rights of LGBT people.

On January 1, 2014, Ellis began as president and CEO of GLAAD, the only U.S. organization working to move lesbian, gay, bisexual and transgender (LGBT) equality forward through the power of the media.

One of the first campaigns Ellis pursued at GLAAD was the organization's 2014 protest against the New York City St. Patrick's Day Parade, specifically the parade's ban of lesbian and gay participants. In an article in the New York Daily News, Ellis wrote about her Irish-American heritage and sexual orientation, calling on parade organizers to end the ban.

Personal life
In 2011, Ellis co-authored a memoir with her wife, Kristen Ellis-Henderson, titled Times Two, Two Women in Love and the Happy Family They Made, released by Simon & Schuster. The autobiography chronicled their simultaneous pregnancies and road to motherhood—it was nominated for a Stonewall Book Award. In 2013, the couple was featured on the "Gay Marriage Already Won" cover of TIME Magazine.

Ellis and her wife were also profiled in a special New York Times Style section about marriage equality following its legalization in New York State and were the subjects of The Huffington Post's three-part documentary web series titled "Here Come the Brides." They were named one of GO Magazine's Most Captivating Couples of 2012 and are the mothers of two children. Ellis's marriage was the first marriage ceremony performed for a same-sex couple in the Episcopal Church of New York State.

Ellis is also a Vestry member of St. Luke's Episcopal Church.

See also
 LGBT culture in New York City
 List of LGBT people from New York City
 New Yorkers in journalism

References

External links

1971 births
Living people
American media executives
Russell Sage College alumni
American women chief executives
American chief executives in the media industry
American LGBT rights activists
LGBT people from New York (state)
People from Staten Island
Episcopalians from New York (state)
LGBT Anglicans
21st-century American women